The cocoa thrush (Turdus fumigatus) is a resident breeding thrush in South America, from eastern Colombia south and east to central and eastern Brazil, as well as on the Caribbean island of Trinidad and some of the Lesser Antilles.

Description
The cocoa thrush is 22–24 cm long. It is dark rufous brown above and paler rufous brown below. There are five poorly defined races, differing mainly in the brightness of the plumage. Sexes are similar, but young birds are duller, having the scalloped underparts common in immature thrushes. The song is a musical warble, and it also produces a variety of typical thrush chuck and chak calls.

Distribution and habitat
In South America, besides the Amazon Basin, the Guianas and the Guiana Shield, the cocoa thrush ranges into two areas. A medium-sized disjunct population lives on southeast coastal Brazil; the narrow coastal range is 300 km wide and extends from Alagoas state in the north to southern Rio de Janeiro state, about 2300 km. Another range for the species is in northeast Colombia and southwest Venezuela. It covers parts of the headwaters of the Caribbean-flowing Orinoco River drainage, and adjacent Amazonian headwaters to the Rio Negro flowing southeast into the Amazon's northwest quadrant. This Colombian-Venezuelan range extends to the coast, and is coastal along northern Venezuela, as it is an extension of the range from the Guianas, (western Guyana). The thrush's range covers the downstream eastern half of the Amazon Basin; in the northeast Basin, it is in Pará and Amapá state with the Guianas. In the southeast Basin, it is in the Tapajos River and Xingu River drainages; also two thirds of the adjacent river system, the lower Araguaia–Tocantins River drainage.

Its preferred habitat is dense forest. The nest is a lined bulky cup of twigs low in a tree or treefern. Two to three reddish-blotched greenish-blue eggs are laid and incubated by the female for about 13 days to hatching. The young then fledge in another 13–15 days.

Behaviour
The cocoa thrush mainly feeds on or near the ground on insects, especially ants and their larvae, earthworms, other invertebrates and some fruits and berries. It is a shy species, but on Trinidad it is much tamer, and will come to feeders.

References

 Thrushes by Clement and Hathaway,

External links
Cocoa Thrush on the Internet Bird Collection
Stamps (for Grenadines of Grenada) incorrect RangeMap
Cocoa Thrush photo gallery VIREO
Photo-High Res; Article tsgcs.co.uk

cocoa thrush
cocoa thrush
Birds of Brazil
Birds of Colombia
Birds of Venezuela
Birds of the Lesser Antilles
Birds of the Guianas
Birds of the Atlantic Forest
cocoa thrush
Birds of the Amazon Basin